The Greenphone was a smartphone developed by Trolltech with Qtopia Phone Edition, a GUI and application platform embedded in Linux using mostly free and open source software.

The proprietary software on the phone includes the communications stack and the package manager. However, Trolltech put these components under GPL in version 4.3 of Qtopia, making it possible to run the Greenphone with no proprietary components by updating its software to Qtopia 4.3.

On October 22, 2007, Trolltech announced that it had sold all inventory of Greenphones and would no longer continue production, having achieved its goal of promoting the Qtopia platform and gaining interest from developers. Focus was shifted to developing the Neo FreeRunner phone. Trolltech intends to continue supporting the Qtopia Greenphone community, and alternative hardware, such as the Neo 1973.

The Greenphone was named after Robert Green, an employee of Trolltech at the time, who jokingly suggested it when the company was having trouble agreeing on a name for the phone.

See also

Android (operating system), developed by Google
FIC Neo 1973 a smartphone developed by Openmoko
Openmoko, which can also run Qtopia
Qtopia

External links

Greenphone developer tutorials
Getting Started with the Trolltech Greenphone SDK

References

Open-source mobile phones
Smartphones
Discontinued smartphones

it:GreenPhone